Matti Tapio Poikala (born 26 July 1935) is a retired Swedish wrestler. He competed in the freestyle lightweight division at the 1964 Summer Olympics, but was eliminated in the second bout. He then won a silver medal at the 1968 European and a bronze at the 1969 world championships in Greco-Roman wrestling, and finished fourth in 1969 in the 74 kg freestyle contest.

Poikala was born in Finland and immigrated to Sweden in 1959.

References

1935 births
Living people
Olympic wrestlers of Sweden
Wrestlers at the 1964 Summer Olympics
Swedish male sport wrestlers
Finnish emigrants to Sweden
World Wrestling Championships medalists
European Wrestling Championships medalists